"Chuck Versus the Anniversary" is the fourth season premiere of Chuck. It originally aired September 20, 2010. When the CIA gains control over the Buy More, Chuck Bartowski begins searching for his mother (Linda Hamilton). Sarah and Casey follow a trail to Russia as they investigate the mysterious Volkoff Industries and its operative, Marco (Dolph Lundgren). Back at home, Ellie delivers big news to her family.

Plot

Main plot
In the Bartowski home at Encino, California, in 1994, Mrs. Bartowski (Linda Hamilton) reads her son Chuck a bedtime story to cheer him up.

Back in the present, Chuck finds his father's research on Mary, confirming that she was a spy . He asks Morgan to help him find her, and to keep it a secret, because Sarah and Casey would try to stop him.

Chuck and Morgan travel all over the world in search of clues as to where his mother could be, until they arrive back in Los Angeles at Mary's safehouse. They find and open a safe, only to find it empty. Their only clue is a menu Morgan finds for a Chinese dumpling shop called Imperial Dragons, with a stylized Asian logo on the cover in red and black. Morgan suggests starting the search for Mary from scratch, but Chuck gives up entirely. The scene then turns to a security camera, and shows Mary sympathetically watching them.

After their car gets repossessed by a repo man, Morgan confesses that their spy travels have left them in severe debt.  Retired from the spy world in "Chuck Versus the Ring: Part II," Chuck goes through a series of strange job interviews, which are each—we later learn—sabotaged by General Beckman. Chuck and Morgan return in desperation to the Buy More, which has been converted into a joint CIA/NSA base. They are both forcibly reinstated into the CIA.  While at the Buy More, Chuck flashes on the EMP generator Sarah and Casey captured, identifying a manufacturing facility in Venezuela run by Volkoff Industries.

As Sarah closes the case for the EMP, Chuck notices that the red and black logo on the case is the same one that was on the Imperial Dragons menu.  After retrieving the menu, Morgan notices a few menu items which are not Chinese food, and one of them triggers a flash on military equipment for submarines.  By pretending to be a member of the "New Ring", Chuck arranges a meeting at Volkoff's facility in Moscow.

After flying to Moscow, Chuck and Morgan infiltrate the facility and start downloading a file on Mary. Chuck and Morgan receive text messages from Sarah and rescue her and Casey and return to the computer to retrieve the file. Marko informs them on the intercom that the whole building has been sealed. Chuck realizes the only way to escape is by firing an EMP, thus sacrificing the information on his mother. After escaping with AK-47s and boarding a bus, Chuck and Sarah celebrate nine months together.

Back in Burbank, CA, Chuck attempts to tell Ellie that he has rejoined the CIA and is searching for their mother, but she interrupts him, under the assumption that he has taken a job at the Buy More. After she confides in him that she is pregnant, he decides to wait to reveal his secrets.

Spy world
Sarah and Casey are on a mission in Hong Kong, where they are chasing a man named Marko (Dolph Lundgren), who has a handheld EMP generator, made by Volkoff Industries. They chase him up a skyscraper, where he is given orders to use the device. Volkoff's men arrive, but Sarah and Casey escape with the device by jumping off the building with parachutes.

After Chuck's flash on the EMP generator, they board a plane for Venezuela. Unfortunately, Marco is on board, incapacitates them and has them transported to Moscow, where he attempts to interrogate them as to the identities of two spies, Chuck and Morgan, who have gotten very close to Volkoff during their search for Chuck's mother. At the same time, Chuck and Morgan have infiltrated the same facility, attempting to hack Volkoff computers for information on Mary. Eventually, they figure out that Casey and Sarah are being held prisoners through text messaging. They are able to free them, but Marco announces over the intercom that the entire building is completely sealed. Team Bartowski uses an EMP device they found to escape. Once they return to Burbank, Casey and Sarah agree to assist Chuck in finding his mother.

Later, Marko goes to Mary to tell her that her family is looking for her. Spurred on by this information, Mary quickly kills Marko and his men and escapes.

Buy More
The Buy More has been rebuilt by the CIA and NSA, and is predominantly — if not fully — staffed by government operatives and analysts working under General Beckman, who has taken over as the new manager. A senior Nerd Herd employee codenamed "Greta" (Olivia Munn) informs Chuck and Morgan when they arrive that, although the store is not yet open for business, they are looking for new employees. When Chuck reluctantly goes to the manager's office in search of a Nerd Herd position, Greta gives Morgan a classified tour of the base and acknowledges her awareness of his and Chuck's billets as operatives.  Beckman forcibly reinstates Morgan and Chuck to the CIA, and they are each involuntarily dropped through a new tunnel to a rebuilt Castle.

Production

At the San Diego Comic-Con in 2010, Josh Schwartz and Chris Fedak announced that from season four the Buy More will be run by the CIA as a base of operations (much like the Orange Orange was in Season Two and Three) with an agent named Greta working undercover as a Buy More executive and "badass greenshirt." This episode introduced the rotating character of Greta, portrayed by Olivia Munn.

Continuity
 This episode takes place nine months after Chuck and Sarah started dating in "Chuck Versus the Other Guy".
 Morgan makes the same mistake that Chuck does in "Chuck Versus the Honeymooners" by using an alias that has essentially the same first and last names.

Flashes
 Chuck locates Volkoff's Venezuela facility after a flash on the EMP device.
 A flash on "Shimira Chicken" tips off Chuck that the Chinese restaurant menu is in fact a means of selling weaponry.
 Chuck flashes on a floor plan while at Volkoff Industries and sees that the building is a former KGB facility.
 Chuck flashes (off-screen) on kung-fu for the first time in months to subdue Volkoff's men.

Cultural references
 Actor Dolph Lundgren twice references his role as Ivan Drago in the film Rocky IV. When preparing to torture Casey and Sarah, he uses Drago's famous quote, "I must break you." He later references Drago again when saying of the team, "If you die, you die." The character was previously referenced by name in "Chuck Versus the Final Exam".
 The travel sequence at the beginning of this episode makes several references to popular culture:
 Raiders of the Lost Ark - The travel map references the map used throughout the Indiana Jones series. The map used by the episode was also created by Dan Curry, who also created those for the Jones films.
 I Spy - The shadow silhouettes.
 The Avengers - Morgan posing with an umbrella.
 Harry Dean Stanton plays a repo man, referencing a previous role.
 Chuck interviews at "Vandalay Industries", a reference to Seinfeld.
 While Mary finishes reading "The Frost Queen" in 1994, a close-up shows Superman, Batman, the Joker, and Transformers action figures with Chuck's token Tron poster.
 Chuck's trip through the tube slide recalls that of James Bond in Japan from the movie You Only Live Twice, both in respect to the tunnel's appearance, and the protagonist being lured into the trap door by another protagonist. The scene also is a nod to a similar scene involving Luke Skywalker on the Bespin Cloud City in The Empire Strikes Back, both aesthetically and that it was immediately preceded by the protagonist's (Luke/Chuck) refusal to work for his nemesis (Vader/Beckman).
 Chuck says "I am a smooth operator like Sade" referring to Sade's song "Smooth Operator".
 When Chuck says they have to go to Russia, Morgan tells him he'll have to sell the Millennium Falcon, another reference to Star Wars.
 The scene with a bus serving as a "getaway car" features in its background the Golden Gate, one of the historical landmarks of Kyiv, Ukraine.

Critical response
 IGN gave this episode a score of 8 out of 10.

References

External links 
 

Anniversary
2010 American television episodes